The Huawei P8 is a Huawei P Series high-end Android smartphone produced by Huawei. It was originally released in April 2015, alongside two different versions:

 The Huawei P8 Lite, a cheaper version was also released in 2015. It can be visually distinguished through the location of the rear flashlight, being to the right of the camera lens instead of between the lens and the edge. An updated version was released in 2017 and was built with less processing power and a smaller battery.
 
 The Huawei P8 Max, a more expensive version. It was built with a larger screen and battery, but otherwise similar to the regular P8.

Reception
In a review, GSMArena criticized the design and the quality of the device. They claimed it lacked high-quality materials compared to other phones in its class and that people weren’t happy with its flush design. The IPS-NE61 display was praised for its black levels and pixel density of 424ppi (pixels per inch). However, the ARM Mali-T628 GPU isn't as powerful as its competitor GPUs. The audio output is good in quality and has average loudness compared to flagship phones. The device was compared to the 2014 Apple flagship as well as Samsung's Galaxy S5, Galaxy A7, and LG's G3.

Common issues include the reported loss of Wi-Fi and poor battery life.

References

External links
 Official Website 

Mobile phones introduced in 2015
Discontinued flagship smartphones
Huawei smartphones
Android (operating system) devices